Mark Matthew Fagan (September 29, 1869 – July 16, 1955) was an Irish Catholic mayor of Jersey City, New Jersey, United States, from 1902 to 1907 and 1913 to 1917.

Biography
He was born on September 29, 1869 in Jersey City. He had little formal education, and as a youth, he worked for his uncle as an undertaker. A Republican, he entered politics while still in his twenties becoming a county freeholder though he was not re-elected.

In 1901, Republican Party boss, Colonel Samuel D. Dickinson, asked him to run for mayor, which Fagan did and won becoming the 27th mayor of Jersey City. At age 32, he was the youngest mayor elected in Jersey City until that time and only the fifth Republican. He was re-elected for three consecutive two-year terms however, after feuding with his own party, he was defeated for re-election in 1907 by H. Otto Wittpenn. He unsuccessfully ran again in 1909.

In 1913, Jersey City went to a city commission form of government, and Fagan was elected commissioner. He was then chosen by his colleagues to be mayor once more. As mayor, he was famous for building schools. In 1917, he stepped down as mayor, retired from politics and continued his career as an undertaker.

Political boss Frank Hague succeeded him as mayor. It would be 75 years before another Republican, Bret Schundler, would be elected mayor of Jersey City.

Fagan died on July 16, 1955 and was buried in Holy Name Cemetery in Jersey City.

See also
List of mayors of Jersey City, New Jersey

References

Further reading
 Noble, Ransom E. New Jersey Progressivism Before Wilson (Princeton UP, 1946) online.

External links
 Chapter 1 of Upbuilders by Lincoln Steffens

1869 births
1955 deaths
Mayors of Jersey City, New Jersey
New Jersey Republicans
American people of Irish descent
Burials at Holy Name Cemetery (Jersey City, New Jersey)